Pedro Homem Pereira was the 17th and last Captain-major of Portuguese Ceylon. Pereira was appointed in 1591 under Philip I of Portugal, he was Captain-major until 1594. The office of Captain-major was abolished and he was succeeded by Pedro Lopes de Sousa as Governor of Portuguese Ceylon.

References

Captain-majors of Ceilão
16th-century Portuguese people